Barkham is a village in England.

Barkham may also refer to:
Barkham baronets
John Barkham (antiquary)
Frederick Barkham (1905–1992), English cricketer